The Sauk Siege was a military standoff that happened on 5 July 2000. It was a attempted coup d'état for Yang di-Pertuan Agong and Malaysian Government by Al-Ma'unah led by Muhammad Amin Mohamed Razali.

The group was made famous by their audacious raid on 2 July 2000 on a camp of Malaysian Army Reserve (Mobilised) in the early hours of the morning and stealing weapons from the armoury. The group was later cornered in the village of Sauk, Kuala Kangsar, Perak and was involved in a stand-off the against the Malaysian Army and Royal Malaysian Police forces. The siege was ended when Malaysian security forces, including the army 22nd Grup Gerak Khas (22nd GGK) and police VAT 69 Pasukan Gerakan Khas, stormed the camp in Operation Dawn.

Event
Mohamed Amin Mohamed Razali led a band of 29 Al-Ma'unah members in a mission to overthrow the Malaysian government. The group included a serving Major in the Royal Malaysian Air Force. They dressed up in uniforms of senior army officers and claimed to be making a surprise inspection of the 304th Malaysian Army Reserve (Rejimen Askar Wataniah) camp at the Temenggor Dam in Gerik, Perak. The group tricked their way through and raided the armouries.

They had previously obtained military fatigues from various outlets and securing three units of Mitsubishi Pajero four-wheel-drive vehicles. The Pajero, of similar make to that used by the Malaysian Army was painted green and given false number plate at a house rented in the town of Kati, for the specific use as a transit point for the group.

In the early hours of 2 July 2000, 20 members of the Al-Maunah group got into three Pajero vehicles and proceeded to Post 2 Kuala Rhui Camp at 2.50 a.m. and then to Camp Bn 304 Rejimen Askar Wataniah at 4.15 a.m.

They talked their way into the Camps by feigning a surprise inspection, to conduct emergency spot checks of all the weapons and ammunition stored at both camps. Impressed by the manner in Amin and the others conducted themselves and assured by the presence of the three Pajero vehicles bearing the military registration numbers beginning with the letter 'Z', the military personnel at the two army camps were duped into allowing the group to take possession of all but one of the various army weapons, ammunition and other army equipment including communication equipment and some even helped the group to carry the weapons into the three Pajeros. They took away a huge cache of firearms and ammunition, including 97 M16 assault rifles, two Steyr AUG rifles, four GPMGs, six light machine guns, five grenade launchers, 182 M16 magazines, eight extra barrels of GPMGs, three extra barrel of LMGs, 26 bayonets, 9,095 rounds of 5.56mm and 60 rounds of 40mm ammunition.

27 of them hid themselves in the jungle in Bukit Jenalik, Sauk, near Kuala Kangsar, in Perak. Amin then distributed the seized arms to his members for practice. The unusual sounds of firearms alerted local inhabitants who alerted the Police. The group made preparations for the operation, including collecting food supplies and taking them to their base in Bukit Jenalik. The food dumps were to keep the base going for about three weeks. They had obtained military fatigues from various outlets and securing three units of Pajero four-wheel-drive vehicles. They also collected weapons such as parang (machete) and cross bows for the purpose of their mission.

Police threw a containment cordon on Bukit Jenalik. A number of security personnel were deployed to penetrate the Al-Ma'unah's camp. However, two of the police personnel Sergeant (Sarjan) Mohd Shah Ahmad and Detective Corporal Raju Saghadevan, as well as civilian Jaafar Puteh and an army personnel, Corporal Matthew anak Medan, were taken hostage by Al-Ma'unah. In a radio communication with the authorities, the group stated their intention to cordon off Kuala Lumpur if their demand for Prime Minister Mahathir Mohamad to resign in 24 hours was unmet. Jaafar Puteh was a civilian who wandered into their camp while looking for durian fruit.

Mohd Shah Ahmad related during the trial that over the four days, the security personnel were abused and tortured. They were made to dig trenches along the sides of Bukit Jenalik to serve as a defence in the event of an attack on the camp. At night, they were tied to a durian tree. It was that Mohd Shah and Sanghadevan buried Corporal Matthew in one of these trenches. Trooper Matthews was apprehended by Jemari Jusoh and when Amin realised the identity of Corporal Matthew, Amin tortured Matthew by shooting his leg. Amin then ordered the Jemari Jusoh to shoot Matthew in cold blood.

On the morning of 5 July 2000, a member of Al Ma'unah, Abu Bakar Ismail was shot by the security forces. In retaliation, Amin and his followers returned fire against the security forces. During this cross fire, Saghadevan was shot dead (Mohd Shah claimed that Amin shot Saghadevan in the head twice). Saghadevan was buried next to Trooper Matthews by Mohd Shah and Jaafar Puteh.

Surrender
Al-Ma'unah later surrendered, and the leaders brought to trial for “waging war upon the King.” The Malaysian Government acted against the Al-Ma'unah group only after giving it every chance to surrender and retained public support by giving the Al-Ma'unah members fair trials and re-integrating them into society.

Mohamed Amin Mohamed Razali was the last to surrender. Just before doing so, he grabbed the Malaysian Army Field Commander, Lieutenant General Zaini Mohd Said by his shirt and tried to shoot him at point-blank range. The General flicked the barrel of Amin's assault rifle and the bullet hit one of the militants. Zaini was later awarded the Seri Pahlawan Gagah Perkasa (S.P.) award for his bravery and contribution in ending the siege without further loss of life.

Lieutenant General Zaini Mohamad Said went up the hill with 43 Army Commando personnel in four armoured personnel carriers followed by 16 infantrymen after Deputy Superintendent of Police, Abd Razak bin Mohd Yusoff, and his VAT 69 Commando team spent two odd hours negotiated and persuaded Amin to surrender. Later, DSP Abd Razak bin Mohd Yusoff informed Zaini that the Al-Ma'unah's group leader has agreed to surrender. When they reached there, about 15 Al-Ma'unah members surrendered the stolen weapons, but refused to give up their parangs which they claimed to be inscribed with Quran verses until relented later. Abd Razak bin Mohd Yusoff was also awarded the Seri Pahlawan Gagah Perkasa for his bravery as a role of mediator in the incident. Razak was the officer-in-charge of the Parachute Branch, Pasukan Gerakan Khas, Royal Malaysian Police.

Deaths

Three people were killed before the group finally surrendered. Detective Corporal R. Saghadevan of the Special Branch was killed, some claimed he was executed, during the siege. The group also killed an Army commando, Corporal Mathew anak Medan, who was shot by Jemari Jusoh. Both were tortured before they were killed. The third person killed was a group member who was shot and killed when he refused to retreat.

Other attacks
Mohamed Amin Mohamed Razali also sent members to bomb the Anchor and Carlsberg breweries in Petaling Jaya and Shah Alam near Kuala Lumpur and the Hindu temple in Batu Caves. Only minor damage was done. Members of the group, Shahidi and Roslan, later admitted to attacking the Carlsberg brewery on the outskirts of Kuala Lumpur with grenade launchers stolen from the army camps.

Trial and sentence
Mohamed Amin and his group were brought to trial for charges of “waging war against the King,” and became the first people convicted of such offence in Malaysia. Amin and his two lieutenants, Zahit Muslim (ex-police VAT-69 commando) and Jamaluddin Darus, were sentenced to death. Sixteen others were given life sentences. In June 2003, the Federal Court turned down Mohamed Amin's appeal for life imprisonment and confirmed the death sentence on him for waging war against the King.

Megat Mohamed Hanafi Ilias, Muhamad Nukhshah Bandi Che Mansor, Riduan Berahim, Azlan Abdul Ghani, Shahidi Ali and Khairul Anuar Mohamed Ariffin, were sentenced by the High Court to ten years in jail after pleading guilty to treason, a lesser charge. They were originally charged with waging war against the King, an offence that carries the death penalty or life imprisonment. Instead, they accepted a guilty plea in a reduced charge of preparing to wage war against the King, which refers to collecting or attempting to collect men, arms or ammunition with the intention of waging war.

15 Al-Mau'nah detainees were released from the detention of the Internal Security Act (ISA) on 24 November 2003, however the release came with a string of conditions which included restricted residence to a particular district, the need to report to police weekly, and a 9 pm to 6 pm curfew.

Mohamed Amin Mohamed Razali hanged
Mohamed Amin Mohamed Razali, leader of a militant group, was hanged at the Sungai Buloh Prison in Selangor on 4 August 2006, as reported by Bernama news agency. Zahit Muslim, Jamaluddin Darus, and Jemari Jusoh were hanged a week earlier.

Pardon
On Merdeka day 2020, Yang di-Pertuan Agong, Sultan Abdullah has granted royal pardon to 13 Al-Maunah convicts as good behaviour in prison.

References

2000 in military history
July 2000 events in Asia
2000 in Malaysia
Sieges